Wu Yun An or Yun-An Wu (Chinese: 吳雲庵, October 25, 1897 - April 18, 1993) was a Chinese medical doctor, a Major General in the Chinese Army and Deputy Surgeon General of the Republic of China from 1945 to 1947, under Gen. Dr. Robert Kho-Seng Lim. In addition, from 1926 to 1928, Dr. Wu was head of public health at Whampoa Military Academy (Chinese: 黃埔軍校). 

Dr. Wu graduated from Church Missionary Society Kwang Chi Medical School (Chinese: 大英廣濟醫學專門學校) in 1919 with degrees in clinical medicine (MB, ChB).

See also
 List of Christian Hospitals in China

References

External links
 Yun-An Wu, memoir archive, University of Heidelberg, Institute of Chinese Studies (Universität Heidelberg, Institut für Sinologie)

Chinese military doctors
National Revolutionary Army generals
Military personnel of the Republic of China
1897 births
1993 deaths
20th-century Chinese physicians